Tamas Menyhart is a Belgian actor born in Budapest, the capital city of Hungary. Tamas Menyhart came to the United States and is now living in Los Angeles, California. He is known for several films including Immortals, Duel of Legends,  ICE Agent, and Greater Threat. Tamas Menyhart has acted in various television series including Without a Trace, Samantha Who?, starring Christina Applegate among many other television series.

Life and career
While growing up in Belgium Tamas Menyhart studied the field of martial arts. He sought out training from some of the top instructors around and studied the martial arts for many years. He decided to become an actor at an early age and moved to Los Angeles where he finally landed his first acting role in a television movie called Out of Darkness where he portrayed the character Detective Claude Louis.  Since then he has moved on to do other television roles and major movies such as the character Heraklion, a fictional character from the movie Immortals. Tamas Menyhart has worked on the same movies and television sets with notable actors such as Mickey Rourke, John Hurt and Isaac C. Singleton Jr. and others.

Filmography

Feature films

Television

Documentary

References
Notes

External links

American male film actors
21st-century American male actors
Living people
Year of birth missing (living people)